Moghradictis is an extinct genus of carnivorous cat-like mammals belonging to the superfamily Aeluroidea, endemic to North Africa (Wadi Moghra, Egypt) during the Early Miocene.

Moghradictis is shown to have an omnivorous diet or more precisely, hypercarnivorous to mesocarnivorous. It is thought to be a member of the Stenoplesictidae family and has only one known species, M. nedjema.

References

Miocene carnivorans
Miocene mammals of Africa
Prehistoric carnivoran genera